The Magical Realms of Tír na nÓg: Escape from Necron 7 – Revenge of Cuchulainn: The Official Game of the Movie – Chapter 2 of the Hoopz Barkley SaGa, also called Barkley 2, was a role-playing video game being developed by Tales of Game's Studios. The game was intended to be a sequel to Barkley, Shut Up and Jam: Gaiden, a 2008 freeware title which itself is a fan game sequel to the basketball game Barkley Shut Up and Jam! and the film Space Jam.

The developers launched a Kickstarter campaign to crowdfund the game in November 2012, with an intended release in early 2014. Although the campaign was successful, the project eventually entered development hell, and by June 2019 it was revealed that most of the developers had left the project. In June 2021, the game was officially cancelled.

Gameplay
Barkley 2 is an action role-playing game that Rock, Paper, Shotgun'''s Nathan Grayson describes will "marry the aesthetics and absurd narrative arcs of Japanese role-players with the openness of Western fare like The Elder Scrolls." The game is designed to change the events in the storyline based on when a player completes certain content: in-game characters, places, and quests will vary depending on the player's actions. The combat in the game is inspired by a range of other titles, including Dark Souls and Borderlands.

Development
Tales of Game's Studios, the developers of Barkley 2, launched a Kickstarter campaign on November 28, 2012, to help crowdfund the costs of producing the game. The initial funding goal for the campaign was set at $35,000. The Kickstarter campaign officially ended with a total of $120,335.

The game is a sequel to the studio's 2008 freeware title Barkley, Shut Up and Jam: Gaiden, which itself was created as a fan game sequel to the 1994 basketball game Barkley Shut Up and Jam! and the film Space Jam. The first game included players from the National Basketball Association (NBA), including Charles Barkley and LeBron James, and made many parodic references to popular culture. The game was styled after 16-bit era Japanese titles like the early games in the Final Fantasy series; however while the original Barkley game was turn-based, the sequel was intended to be an action RPG. Barkley 2 was developed using Game Maker, the same creation kit that was used to create the first Barkley'' game. 

The developers announced on the Kickstarter campaign page that they anticipated a release in late 2013 or early 2014. However, in late 2016 a Tales of Game's staff member confirmed in an update to the campaign that their Kickstarter funds had been depleted, suggesting the game had fallen into development hell. On June 2, 2019, a Kickstarter update confirmed that the majority of developers have left the project and that development is moving slowly, with only two people left on the project working on it part-time, neither of them members of the original team that made the first game.

On June 11, 2021, the game was officially cancelled, and the source code repository (with assets included) was released to the public under a CC BY-NC 4.0 license.

References

External links

Playable demo

Cancelled Linux games
Cancelled macOS games
Cancelled Windows games
Action role-playing video games
Commercial video games with freely available source code
Creative Commons-licensed video games
Kickstarter-funded video games
Role-playing video games
Vaporware video games